Datura stramonium, known by the common names thorn apple, jimsonweed (jimson weed), devil's snare, or devil's trumpet, is a poisonous flowering plant of the nightshade family Solanaceae. It is a species belonging to the Datura genus and Daturae tribe. Its likely origin was in Central America, and it has been introduced in many world regions. It is an aggressive invasive weed in temperate climates across the world. D. stramonium has frequently been employed in traditional medicine to treat a variety of ailments. It has also been used as a hallucinogen (of the anticholinergic/antimuscarinic,  deliriant type), taken entheogenically to cause intense, sacred or occult visions. It is unlikely ever to become a major drug of abuse owing to effects upon both mind and body frequently perceived as being highly unpleasant, giving rise to a state of profound and long-lasting disorientation or delirium (anticholinergic syndrome) with a potentially fatal outcome. It contains tropane alkaloids which are responsible for the psychoactive effects, and may be severely toxic.

Description

The root is long, thick, fibrous, and white. The stem is stout, erect, leafy, smooth, and pale yellow-green to reddish purple in color. The stem forks off repeatedly into branches and each fork forms a leaf and a single, erect flower.

The upper surface of the leaves is a darker green, and the bottom is a light green. The leaves have a bitter and nauseating taste, which is imparted to extracts of the herb, and remains even after the leaves have been dried.

Datura stramonium generally flowers throughout the summer. The calyx is long and tubular, swollen at the bottom, and sharply angled, surmounted by five sharp teeth. The corolla, which is folded and only partially open, is white, funnel-shaped, and has prominent ribs. The flowers open at night, emitting a pleasant fragrance, and are fed upon by nocturnal moths.

At maturity, it splits into four chambers, each with dozens of small, black seeds.

Etymology and common names

The genus name is derived from the plant's Hindi name, dhatūra, ultimately from Sanskrit  'white thorn-apple'. The origin of Neo-Latin stramonium is unknown; the name Stramonia was used in the 17th century for various Datura species.  There is some evidence that Stramonium is originally from Greek  "nightshade" and  "which makes mad". It is called umathai (ஊமத்தை) in Tamil.

In the United States the plant is called "jimsonweed", or more rarely "Jamestown weed" deriving from the town of Jamestown, Virginia, where English soldiers consumed it while attempting to suppress Bacon's Rebellion. They spent 11 days in altered mental states:

Common names for Datura stramonium vary by region and include thornapple, moon flower, hell's bells, devil's trumpet, devil's weed, tolguacha, Jamestown weed, stinkweed, locoweed, pricklyburr, false castor oil plant, and devil's cucumber.

Range and habitat
Datura stramonium is native to North America, but was spread widely to the Old World early where it has also become naturalized.  It was scientifically described and named by Swedish botanist Carl Linnaeus in 1753, although it had been described a century earlier by botanists such as Nicholas Culpeper. Today, it grows wild in all the world's warm and temperate regions, where it is found along roadsides and at dung-rich livestock enclosures. In Europe, it is found as a weed  in garbage dumps and wastelands, and is toxic to animals consuming it. In South Africa, it is colloquially known by the Afrikaans name malpitte ("mad seeds").

Through observation, the seed is thought to be carried by birds and spread in their droppings. Its seeds can lie dormant underground for years and germinate when the soil is disturbed.  The Royal Horticultural Society has advised worried gardeners to dig it up or have it otherwise removed, while wearing gloves to handle it.

Toxicity
All parts of Datura plants contain dangerous levels of the tropane alkaloids atropine, hyoscyamine, and scopolamine, which are classified as deliriants, or anticholinergics. The risk of fatal overdose is high among uninformed users, and many hospitalizations occur among recreational users who ingest the plant for its psychoactive effects. Deliberate or inadvertent poisoning resulting from smoking jimsonweed and other related species has been reported.

The amount of toxins varies widely from plant to plant. As much as a 20:1 variation can be found between plants, and a given plant's toxicity depends on its age, where it is growing, and the local weather conditions. A particularly strong difference has been found between plants growing in their native ranges and plants that have adjusted to growing in non-native ranges where the atropine and scopolamine concentration may be up to 20–40 times lower than in the native range, it is suspected that this is an evolutionary response to lower predatory pressures. Additionally, within a given plant, toxin concentration varies by part and even from leaf to leaf. When the plant is younger, the ratio of scopolamine to atropine is about 3:1; after flowering, this ratio is reversed, with the amount of scopolamine continuing to decrease as the plant gets older. In traditional cultures, a great deal of experience with and detailed knowledge of Datura was critical to minimize harm. An individual seed contains about 0.1 mg of atropine, and the approximate fatal dose for adult humans is >10 mg atropine or >2–4 mg scopolamine.

Datura intoxication typically produces delirium, hallucination, hyperthermia, tachycardia, bizarre behavior, urinary retention, and severe mydriasis with resultant painful photophobia that can last several days. Pronounced amnesia is another commonly reported effect. The onset of symptoms generally occurs around 30 to 60 minutes after ingesting the herb. These symptoms generally last from 24 to 48 hours, but have been reported in some cases to last as long as two weeks.

As with other cases of anticholinergic poisoning, intravenous physostigmine can be administered in severe cases as an antidote.

Poisoning incidents
In Australia in December 2022, around 200 people reported becoming ill after eating products containing spinach sold mostly through Costco. Datura stramonium was identified as the contaminant, whose young leaves had been picked alongside the spinach leaves. The weed had spread due to increased rainfall. The grower, Riviera Farms, is from the Gippsland region of Victoria and acted promptly to eradicate the weed.

Uses

Note that in all cases, safer alternatives probably exist.  The following must not be construed as medical advice.

Traditional medicine

One of the primary active agents in Datura is atropine which has been used in traditional medicine and recreationally over centuries. The leaves are generally smoked either in a cigarette or a pipe. During the late 18th century, James Anderson, the English Physician General of the East India Company, learned of the practice and popularized it in Europe. The Chinese also used it as a form of anesthesia during surgery.

Early medicine
John Gerard's Herball (1597) states,

William Lewis reported, in the late 18th century, that the juice could be made into "a very powerful remedy in various convulsive and spasmodic disorders, epilepsy and mania," and was also "found to give ease in external inflammations and haemorrhoids".

In treatment of respiratory diseases
Henry Hyde Salter discusses D. stramonium as a treatment for asthma in his 19th-century work On Asthma: its Pathology and Treatment.

Smoking of herbs, including D. stramonium, has been a recognized temporary relief to asthmatics by physicians since antiquity, onto the early 20th century. The mainstream medical use of smoking D. stramonium to treat asthma would later wane in popularity, following new understandings of asthma as an allergic inflammatory reaction, and developments in pharmacology that provided a variety of new, immediately more effective treatments for asthma.

Muscarinic antagonists, found in the tribe Datureae (among other plants), such as atropine, and synthetic tropane derivatives selective for muscarinic acetylcholine receptor subtypes such as ipratropium bromide and tiotropium bromide, are prescribed in some cases of chronic obstructive pulmonary disease and asthma.

Spiritualism and the occult

Across the Americas, indigenous peoples, such as the Algonquian, Aztecs, Navajo, Cherokee, Luiseño and the indigenous peoples of Marie-Galante used this plant or other Datura species in sacred ceremonies for its hallucinogenic properties. In Ethiopia, some students and debtrawoch (lay priests), use D. stramonium to "open the mind" to be more receptive to learning, and creative and imaginative thinking.

The common name "datura" has its origins in India, where the sister species Datura metel is considered particularly sacred — believed to be a favorite of Shiva in Shaivism. Both Datura stramonium and D. metel have reportedly been used by some sadhus and charnel ground ascetics, such as the Aghori as both an entheogen and ordeal poison. It was sometimes mixed with cannabis as well as highly poisonous plants like Aconitum ferox to intentionally create dysphoric experiences. They used unpleasant or toxic plants such as these in order to achieve spiritual liberation (moksha) in settings of extreme horror and discomfort.

Among its sacred and visionary purposes, jimson weed has also garnered a reputation for its magical uses in various cultures throughout history. In his book, The Serpent and the Rainbow, Wade Davis identified D. stramonium, called "zombi cucumber" in Haiti, as a central ingredient of the concoction vodou priests use to create zombies. However it has been noted that the process of zombification is not directly performed by vodou priests of the loa but rather by bokors. In European witchcraft, D. stramonium was also a common ingredient used for making witches' flying ointment along with other poisonous plants of the nightshade family. It was often responsible for the hallucinogenic effects of magical or lycanthropic salves and potions. During the witch-phobia craze in Early Modern times in England and parts of the colonial Northeastern United States it was often considered unlucky or inappropriate to grow the plant in one's garden as it was considered to be an aid to incantations.

Cultivation
Datura stramonium prefers rich, calcareous soil. Adding nitrogen fertilizer to the soil increases the concentration of alkaloids present in the plant. D. stramonium can be grown from seed, which is sown with several feet between plants. It is sensitive to frost, so should be sheltered during cold weather. The plant is harvested when the fruits are ripe, but still green. To harvest, the entire plant is cut down, the leaves are stripped from the plant, and everything is left to dry. When the fruits begin to burst open, the seeds are harvested.

References

External links
 
 
 USDA Natural Resources Conservation Service PLANTS Profile: Datura stramonium L.
 Datura stramonium at Liber Herbarum II
 Datura spp. at Erowid
 Datura stramonium Pictures and information

stramonium
Deliriants
Entheogens
Herbal and fungal hallucinogens
Medicinal plants of North America
Native American religion
Plants used in traditional Chinese medicine
Flora of Mexico
Plants described in 1753
Taxa named by Carl Linnaeus
Poisonous plants